Lanosterol synthase is an oxidosqualene cyclase (OSC) enzyme that converts (S)-2,3-oxidosqualene to a protosterol cation and finally to lanosterol. Lanosterol is a key four-ringed intermediate in cholesterol biosynthesis. In humans, lanosterol synthase is encoded by the LSS gene.

In eukaryotes, lanosterol synthase is an integral monotopic protein associated with the cytosolic side of the endoplasmic reticulum. Some evidence suggests that the enzyme is a soluble, non-membrane bound protein in the few prokaryotes that produce it.

Due to the enzyme's role in cholesterol biosynthesis, there is interest in lanosterol synthase inhibitors as potential cholesterol-reducing drugs, to complement existing statins.

Mechanism

Though some data on the mechanism has been obtained by the use of suicide inhibitors, mutagenesis studies, and homology modeling, it is still not fully understood how the enzyme catalyzes the formation of lanosterol.

Initial epoxide protonation and ring opening
Before the acquisition of the protein's X-ray crystal structure, site-directed mutagenesis was used to determine residues key to the enzyme's catalytic activity. It was determined that an aspartic acid residue (D455) and two histidine residues (H146 and H234) were essential to enzyme function. Corey et al. hypothesized that the aspartic acid acts by protonating the substrate's epoxide ring, thus increasing its susceptibility to intramolecular attack by the nearest double bond, with H146 possibly intensifying the proton donor ability of the aspartic acid through hydrogen bonding. After acquisition of the X-ray crystal structure of the enzyme, the role of D455 as a proton donor to the substrate's epoxide was confirmed, though it was found that D455 is more likely stabilized by hydrogen bonding from two cysteine residues (C456 and C533) than from the earlier suggested histidine.

Ring formation cascade
Epoxide protonation activates the substrate, setting off a cascade of ring forming reactions. Four rings in total (A through D) are formed, producing the cholesterol backbone.  Though the idea of a concerted formation of all four rings had been entertained in the past, kinetic studies with (S)-2,3-oxidosqualene analogs showed that product formation is achieved through discrete carbocation intermediates (see Figure 1). Isolation of monocyclic and bicyclic products from lanosterol synthase mutants has further weakened the hypothesis of a concerted mechanism. Evidence suggests that epoxide ring opening and A ring formation is concerted, though.

Structure
Lanosterol synthase is a two-domain monomeric protein composed of two connected (α/α) barrel domains and three smaller β-structures. The enzyme active site is in the center of the protein, closed off by a constricted channel. Passage of the (S)-2,3-epoxysqualene substrate through the channel requires a change in protein conformation. In eukaryotes, a hydrophobic surface (6% of the total enzyme surface area) is the ER membrane-binding region (see Figure 2).

The enzyme contains five fingerprint regions containing Gln-Trp motifs, which are also present in the highly analogous bacterial enzyme squalene-hopene cyclase.   Residues of these fingerprint regions contain stacked sidechains which are thought to contribute to enzyme stability during the highly exergonic cyclization reactions catalyzed by the enzyme.

Function

Catalysis of lanosterol formation
Lanosterol synthase catalyzes the conversion of (S)-2,3-epoxysqualene to lanosterol, a key four-ringed intermediate in cholesterol biosynthesis. Thus, it in turn provides the precursor to estrogens, androgens, progestogens, glucocorticoids, mineralocorticoids, and neurosteroids. In eukaryotes the enzyme is bound to the cytosolic side of the endoplasmic reticulum membrane.  While cholesterol synthesis is mostly associated with eukaryotes, few prokaryotes have been found to express lanosterol synthase; it has been found as a soluble protein in Methylococcus capsulatus.

Catalysis of epoxylanosterol formation
Lanosterol synthase also catalyzes the cyclization of 2,3;22,23-diepoxysqualene to 24(S),25-epoxylanosterol, which is later converted to 24(S),25-epoxycholesterol. Since the enzyme affinity for this second substrate is greater than for the monoepoxy (S)-2,3-epoxysqualene, under partial inhibition conversion of 2,3;22,23-diepoxysqualene to 24(S),25-epoxylanosterol is favored over lanosterol synthesis. This has relevance for disease prevention and treatment.

Clinical significance

Enzyme inhibitors as cholesterol-lowering drugs
Interest has grown in lanosterol synthase inhibitors as drugs to lower blood cholesterol and treat atherosclerosis. The widely popular statin drugs currently used to lower LDL (low-density lipoprotein) cholesterol function by inhibiting HMG-CoA reductase activity. Because this enzyme catalyzes the formation of precursors far upstream of (S)-2,3-epoxysqualene and cholesterol, statins may negatively influence amounts of intermediates required for other biosynthetic pathways (e.g. synthesis of isoprenoids, coenzyme Q). Thus, lanosterol synthase, which is more closely tied to cholesterol biosynthesis than HMG-CoA reductase, is an attractive drug target.

Lanosterol synthase inhibitors are thought to lower LDL and VLDL cholesterol by a dual control mechanism. Studies in which lanosterol synthase is partially inhibited have shown both a direct decrease in lanosterol formation and a decrease in HMG-CoA reductase activity. The oxysterol 24(S),25-epoxylanosterol, which is preferentially formed over lanosterol during partial lanosterol synthase inhibition, is believed to be responsible for this inhibition of HMG-CoA reductase activity.

Evolution
It is believed that oxidosqualene cyclases (OSCs, the class to which lanosterol cyclase belongs) evolved from bacterial squalene-hopene cyclase (SHC), which is involved with the formation of hopanoids. Phylogenetic trees constructed from the amino acid sequences of OSCs in diverse organisms suggest a single common ancestor, and that the synthesis pathway evolved only once. The discovery of steranes including cholestane in 2.7-billion year-old shales from Pilbara Craton, Australia, suggests that eukaryotes with OSCs and complex steroid machinery were present early in earth's history.

References

Further reading

External links 
 

EC 5.4.99